Mark Komade (born 15 July 1983) is a Ghanaian football striker. He currently plays for Ashanti Gold SC.

Career
On 23 June 2006 he moved from Rot-Weiss Essen to Ashanti Gold SC. He played four years in Germany of Senior Level Regionalliga with Rot-Weiss Essen.

External links
Sport MSN Profile

References

1983 births
Living people
Ghanaian footballers
Rot-Weiss Essen players
Expatriate footballers in Germany
Ashanti Gold SC players
Association football forwards